A leadscrew (or lead screw), also known as a power screw or translation screw, is a screw used as a linkage in a machine, to translate turning motion into linear motion.  Because of the large area of sliding contact between their male and female members, screw threads have larger frictional energy losses compared to other linkages.  They are not typically used to carry high power, but more for intermittent use in low power actuator and positioner mechanisms.  Leadscrews are commonly used in linear actuators, machine slides (such as in machine tools), vises, presses, and jacks. Leadscrews are a common component in electric linear actuators.

Leadscrews are manufactured in the same way as other thread forms (they may be rolled, cut, or ground).

A lead screw is sometimes used with a split nut (also called half nut) which allows the nut to be disengaged from the threads and moved axially, independently of the screw's rotation, when needed (such as in single-point threading on a manual lathe). A split nut can also be used to compensate for wear by compressing the parts of the nut.

A hydrostatic leadscrew overcomes many of the disadvantages of a normal leadscrew, having high positional accuracy, very low friction, and very low wear, but requires continuous supply of high pressure fluid and high precision manufacture, leading to significantly greater cost than most other linear motion linkages.

Types
Power screws are classified by the geometry of their thread.

V-thread

V-threads are less suitable for leadscrews than others such as Acme because they have more friction between the threads. Their threads are designed to induce this friction to keep the fastener from loosening. Leadscrews, on the other hand, are designed to minimize friction. Therefore, in most commercial and industrial use, V-threads are avoided for leadscrew use. Nevertheless, V-threads are sometimes successfully used as leadscrews, for example on microlathes and micromills.

Square thread

Square threads are named after their square geometry. They are the most efficient, having the least friction, so they are often used for screws that carry high power.  But they are also the most difficult to machine, and are thus the most expensive.

Acme thread / Trapezoidal thread

Acme threads have a 29° thread angle, which is easier to machine than square threads. They are not as efficient as square threads, due to the increased friction induced by the thread angle. Acme threads are generally also stronger than square threads due to their trapezoidal thread profile, which provides greater load-bearing capabilities.

Buttress thread

Buttress threads are of a triangular shape. These are used where the load force on the screw is only applied in one direction. They are as efficient as square threads in these applications, but are easier to manufacture.

Advantages & disadvantages

The advantages of a leadscrew are:

Large load carrying capability
Compact
Simple to design
Easy to manufacture; no specialized machinery is required
Large mechanical advantage
Precise and accurate linear motion
Smooth, quiet, and low maintenance
Minimal number of parts
Most are self-locking (cannot be back-driven)

The disadvantages are that most are not very efficient. Due to the low efficiency they cannot be used in continuous power transmission applications. They also have a high degree of friction on the threads, which can wear the threads out quickly. For square threads, the nut must be replaced; for trapezoidal threads, a split nut may be used to compensate for the wear.

Alternatives
Alternatives to actuation by leadscrew include:
 Ball screws and roller screws (sometimes categorized as types of leadscrew rather than in contradistinction)
 Fluid power (i.e., hydraulics and pneumatics)
 Gear trains (e.g., worm drives, rack-and-pinion drives)
 Electromagnetic actuation (e.g., solenoids)
 Piezoelectric actuation

Mechanics

The torque required to lift or lower a load can be calculated by "unwrapping" one revolution of a thread. This is most easily described for a square or buttress thread as the thread angle is 0 and has no bearing on the calculations. The force of the load is directed downward, the normal force is perpendicular to the hypotenuse of the triangle, the frictional force is directed in the opposite direction of the direction of motion (perpendicular to the normal force or along the hypotenuse), and an imaginary "effort" force is acting horizontally in the direction opposite the direction of the frictional force. Using this free-body diagram the torque required to lift or lower a load can be calculated:

where
 = torque
 = load on the screw
 = mean diameter
 = coefficient of friction (common values are found in the adjacent table)
 = lead
 = angle of friction
 = lead angle

Based on the  equation it can be found that the screw is self-locking when the coefficient of friction is greater than the tangent of the lead angle. An equivalent comparison is when the friction angle is greater than the lead angle. When this is not true the screw will back-drive, or lower under the weight of the load.

Efficiency 
The efficiency, calculated using the torque equations above, is:

Non-zero thread angle 
For screws that have a thread angle other than zero, such as a trapezoidal thread, this must be compensated as it increases the frictional forces. The equations below take this into account:

where  is one half the thread angle.

If the leadscrew has a collar in which the load rides on then the frictional forces between the interface must be accounted for in the torque calculations as well. For the following equation the load is assumed to be concentrated at the mean collar diameter:

For collars that use thrust bearings the frictional loss is negligible and the above equation can be ignored.

Efficiency for non-zero thread angles can be written as follows:

Running speed 

The running speed for a leadscrew (or ball screw) is typically limited to, at most, 80% of the calculated critical speed.
The critical speed is the speed that excites the natural frequency of the screw.
For a steel leadscrew or steel ballscrew, the critical speed is approximately

where
 = critical speed in RPM
 = smallest (root) diameter of the leadscrew in inches
 = length between bearing supports in inches
 = .36 for one end fixed, one end free
 = 1.00 for both ends simple
 = 1.47 for one end fixed, one end simple
 = 2.23 for both ends fixed
Alternatively using metric units:

  = 3.9 for fixed-free supports 
  = 12.1 for both ends supported
   = 18.7 for fixed-supported structure
  = 27.2 for both ends fixed

See also
 Ball screw
 Fine adjustment screw
 Jackscrew

References

Bibliography
.
 . Originally published in 1998; content updated with each print run, similar to a "revised edition". Currently in the fourth print run.
.

External links

Screws